The following units and commanders fought in the Chattanooga–Ringgold campaign of the American Civil War on the Confederate side. The Union order of battle is shown separately. Order of battle compiled from the army organization on November 20, 1863 and the reports.

Abbreviations used

Military rank
 Gen = General
 LTG = Lieutenant General
 MG = Major General
 BG = Brigadier General
 Col = Colonel
 Ltc = Lieutenant Colonel
 Maj = Major
 Cpt = Captain
 Lt = Lieutenant
 Sgt = Sergeant
 Cpl = Corporal

Other
 (w) = wounded
 (mw) = mortally wounded
 (k) = killed in action
 (c) = captured

Army of Tennessee

Gen Braxton Bragg

Escort:
 1st Louisiana (Regulars)
 1st Louisiana Cavalry

Hardee's Corps

LTG William J. Hardee

Breckinridge's Corps

MG John C. Breckinridge

Wheeler's Cavalry Corps
MG Joseph Wheeler

Reserve artillery

Notes

References 
 Cozzens, Peter. The Shipwreck of Their Hopes: The Battles for Chattanooga. Urbana: University of Illinois Press, 1994. .
 U.S. War Department, The War of the Rebellion: a Compilation of the Official Records of the Union and Confederate Armies, U.S. Government Printing Office, 1880–1901.

American Civil War orders of battle